Chuburkhindji (Chuburkhinji;) (known as Tzalamukhi [წალამუხი] until 1957) is a village in the Gali District of Abkhazia, Georgia. As is the case in the rest of the district its population is almost exclusively Georgian.

History 
The village is the place of regular quadripartite (Georgian-Abkhaz-CIS peacekeepers-UNOMIG) meetings known informally as the "Chuburkhinji sessions". The meetings have been suspended by the Abkhaz side since November 2006.

On 24 May 2012, a settlement was opened in Chuburkhinji for the families of Russian border guards.

See also
 Gali District, Abkhazia

References

Populated places in Gali District, Abkhazia
Sukhum Okrug
Abkhaz–Georgian conflict